Creamfields is an electronic dance music festival series founded and organised by British club promoter Cream, with its UK edition taking place on August Bank Holiday weekend, with a number of international editions held across various territories worldwide.

First held in 1998 in Winchester, the festival moved to Cream's home city of Liverpool the following year, taking place on the old Liverpool airport, before moving to its current location on the Daresbury estate in Cheshire. The festival, having initially begun as a one-day event with 25,000 people in attendance, is now a four-day event with camping options hosting 70,000 per day. The festival is the UK's most prestigious electronic dance music festival.

In 2022, Creamfields celebrated its 25th anniversary by launching a second UK-based festival - Creamfields South. Creamfields South took place at Hylands Park, Chelmsford across the Platinum Jubilee weekend in June and is scheduled to return in 2023, with the original Daresbury festival being renamed Creamfields North.

History
Creamfields initially began in 1998 as a one-day annual event run by the Liverpool night club Cream. This first edition was held in Winchester, Hampshire and attracted 25,000 people. The following year Creamfields moved to Liverpool, Merseyside, with the festival being on the old Liverpool Airfield. The move put the festival closer to its parent night club and the new site was able to hold 50,000 people for the festival. In 2002, Cream was demolished, however the brand continued to run the festival. 2006 saw the festival move outside the city to its current location in Daresbury, Cheshire. The 10th anniversary of the festival saw it expanded to a two-day event with 50,000 people attending across the weekend. The festival saw its site expand over the next few years after its first sell out in 2009 of 60,000 across in weekend. In 2010, the site was expanded for extra tickets sales and growing demand for campers. In addition to this, the festival sold out 80,000 tickets and again in 2011 with 100,000.

In 2012 the festival ownership changed hands as Cream was bought out by Live Nation who are the current organisers of the event. The festival was also set to expand to a three-day event, however, on the final day the festival was abandoned due to heavy rain. The following year a £500,000 investment into the site was made to protect it against bad weather. The three-day event allowed an attendance of 150,000. 2014 saw the edition of a second primary stage, the North and South Stage; and in 2015, the festival was live streamed for the first time seeing 500,000 online attendees. 2016 saw the introduction of the Steel Yard stage which spawned a spinoff mini-festival with events held in Liverpool and London, it also saw the festival become a four-day event with site expansion in 2017 allowing for a maximum attendance of 280,000. In 2019, a £2,000,000 investment was made to improve security and safety as well as reducing environmental impact. The festival itself saw Creamfields host Swedish House Mafia in their Save the World Reunion Tour. The show was the supergroup's first UK show since 2012 and saw the group as the sole occupiers of the festival's iconic Arc Stage on the day of the event.

The 2020 edition of the festival was cancelled due to the COVID-19 pandemic, with a virtual festival taking its place. Following Boris Johnson's announcement on the 22 February regarding the road out of the UK's COVID-19 lockdown, Creamfields announced the 2021 edition would go ahead. Tickets for the event sold out in record time.

2022 saw the introduction of a second UK-based festival - Creamfields South was held at Hylands Park in Chelmsford, hosting headline acts such as David Guetta and Calvin Harris. Organisers added they expect the festival to continue and become 'a solid and regular fixture on the UK festival circuit', with Creamfields South confirmed to be returning for 2023.

Edition's summary

Nb: Artists shown in the table below were headliners for the event. For full line-ups see List of Creamfields line-ups.

Album

On 9 August 2004, British DJ Paul Oakenfold released his fifteenth DJ Mix album entitled Creamfields. The album was released in advance of the sixth edition of the festival in 2004 of which Oakenfold was due to perform. The album itself is third in a series of remix album with the other two being made by other DJs. In 2019, Oakenfold released a further DJ mix album to celebrate the festival's twentieth anniversary.

Creamfields: Steel Yard
The 2016 edition of Creamfields saw the debut of the Steel Yard stage at the main event in Daresbury, Cheshire. The stage is a 15,000 capacity super structure designed and built by Acorn Events.
 
Steel Yard Liverpool made its debut in 2016 at the city's Clarence Graving Dock, and now occurs annually in late November or early December.
 
Steel Yard London initially took place in late October at Victoria Park, London in 2017, before moving to Finsbury Park for 2018 and 2019 respectively, with a new date on the late-May bank holiday weekend. 
 
In 2018, Steel Yard Liverpool partnered with Tomorrowland and Dimitri Vegas & Like Mike to bring "Garden of Madness" to the UK for a special one-off event.

Creamfields International

In addition to the two main UK events, Creamfields also operates a number of international spin offs including:

 Creamfields Abu Dhabi
 Creamfields Australia (2010–2012; 2017)
 Creamfields Brazil
 Creamfields Buenos Aires (2001–2015)
 Creamfields Czech Republic (2002)
 Creamfields Chile (2004-2018; 2022-present)
 Creamfields China (2018–present)
 Creamfields Colombia
 Creamfields Hong Kong (2017–present)
 Creamfields Ibiza
 Creamfields Ireland (2000–2002)
 Creamfields Mallorca
 Creamfields Malta
 Creamfields Mexico
 Creamfields Romania
 Creamfields Paraguay
 Creamfields Poland
 Creamfields Portugal
 Creamfields Peru
 Creamfields Spain
 Creamfields Taiwan: (2017–present)
 Creamfields Thailand (2022–present)
 Creamfields Turkey
 Creamfields Ukraine
 Creamfields Vietnam

Awards and nominations

DJ Awards

DJ Magazine's top 50 Festivals

Festicket Awards

International Dance Music Awards

UK Festival Awards

See also
List of electronic music festivals
List of Creamfields line-ups
Creamfields Australia
Creamfields BA

Notes

References

External links

Official site

Music festivals established in 1998
Music festivals in Cheshire
Rave culture in the United Kingdom
1998 establishments in the United Kingdom
Events in Liverpool
Tourist attractions in Cheshire
Electronic music festivals in the United Kingdom